The white-bellied mosaic-tailed rat (Melomys leucogaster) is a species of rodent in the family Muridae.
It is found in West Papua, Indonesia and Papua New Guinea.

References

Melomys
Rodents of Papua New Guinea
Mammals of Western New Guinea
Mammals described in 1908
Taxonomy articles created by Polbot
Taxa named by Fredericus Anna Jentink
Rodents of New Guinea